Eletto Contieri (1 February 1912 - ?) was an Italian decathlete, speciality in which he was 8th at the 1934 European Athletics Championships. 

Three-time national champion at senior level.

Biography
After his career as an athlete, Contieri embarked on that of sports manager and on 15 January 1946 he was elected president of the Regional Committee of FIDAL del Friuli Venezia Giulia and, later, also national councilor during the presidency of Bruno Zauli. At least until 1950, when he moved to Rio de Janeiro for work reasons.

Achievements

See also
 Italy at the 1934 European Athletics Championships

References

External links
 
 

1912 births
Date of death unknown
Place of death unknown
Italian decathletes
Sportspeople from Venice